Social Theory of International Politics is an academic book by Alexander Wendt. It expresses a constructivist approach to the study of international relations and is one of the leading texts within the constructivist approach to international relations scholarship.

Social Theory of International Politics expresses a theory that emphasises the role of shared ideas and norms in shaping state behaviour. It is critical of both liberal and realists approaches to the study of international relations which, Wendt argues, emphasize materialist and individualistic motivations for state actions rather than norms and shared values as Wendt argues they should.

In a review of Social Theory of International Politics in Foreign Affairs G. John Ikenberry argues that the first section of the book is a "winding tour" of constructivism's underpinning. After this Wendt explores possible alternative "cultures" of international relations (Hobbesian, Lockean, and Kantian) a result of his view that anarchy does not necessarily mean that states must adopt egoistical self-help behaviour. Wendt further explores this view in an influential journal article "Anarchy Is What States Make of It" published in the journal International Organization.

The book was the winner of International Studies Association Best Book of the Decade Award 1991–2000.  The title is a reference to Kenneth Waltz's 1979 work Theory of International Politics.

Summary

Four sociologies of international politics

Part I: Social Theory

Scientific realism and social kinds

Ideas all the way down?

Structure, agency and culture

Part II: International Politics

The state and the problem of corporate agency

Three cultures of anarchy
In this chapter Wendt challenges the neorealist view of anarchy and argues that several cultures of anarchy can dominate. These are called Hobbesian, Lockean, and Kantian cultures.

Process and structural change

Conclusion

Criticism

Realist criticism
In a review essay called "The Constructivist Challenge to Structural Realism" Dale Copeland argues from a structural realist perspective and states that Wendt fails to take into account how uncertainty impacts state behaviour:

Notwithstanding Wendt's important contributions to international relations theory, his critique of structural realism has inherent flaws. Most important, it does not adequately address a critical aspect of the realist worldview: the problem of uncertainty.

Constructivist criticism
Wendt admits that his version of constructivism is a "thin" version of  constructivism as it “concedes important points to materialist and individualist perspectives [of neorealism] and endorses a scientific approach to social inquiry". As such it has been criticised from the position of more radical "thick" constructivists who give less ground to rationalist theories, like Roxanne Lynn Doty, Stefano Guzzini, Friedrich Kratochwill, and Maja Zehfuss.

References

External links
Review

International relations theory
Constructivism
1999 non-fiction books
Books by Alexander Wendt
Books about international relations